Bishan Lal Saini (born 1954) is an Indian politician. Saini is a Member of the Haryana Legislative Assembly from Radaur Assembly constituency. He was elected in 2019 representing the Indian National Congress. He was elected in 2009 from Radaur Assembly constituency representing the Indian National Lok Dal. Saini lost to Shyam Singh Rana in 2009.

Early life and education 
Bishan Lal Saini was born as Bishan Saini in 1954 to Sukh Ram Saini in Radaur, Haryana.   

Saini is a Graduate in Ayurvedic Medicine and Surgery from Shri Mast Nath Ayurvedic College, Rohtak in 1977 under Maharshi Dayanand University, Rohtak.

References 

Living people
1954 births
Indian National Congress politicians from Haryana
Indian National Lok Dal politicians
Haryana MLAs 2009–2014
Haryana MLAs 2019–2024